David Wadelton (born 1955) is an Australian artist who lives and works in Melbourne. He is best known for his cyber-pop paintings, almost photorealist in style.

Career
Since 1984 he has had nearly 20 solo exhibitions in galleries in Melbourne and Sydney, including Pinacotheca, Melbourne and Annandale Galleries Sydney. The most recent exhibitions include Pop Life at Rex Irwin Gallery, 1998; Brand Power, Robert Lindsay Gallery Melbourne 1998; Techno Pop at Robert Lindsay Gallery, Melbourne, 2000; Brand New Release, Tolarno Galleries, Melbourne, 2003 and a solo show at Tolarno Galleries during the 2004 Melbourne Art Fair. He has also been the subject of a major survey exhibition, "Pictorial Knowledge", at Geelong Art Gallery in 1998.

In addition to his painting career Wadelton has played in bands Ad Hoc and Signals with Dave Brown, Philip Thomson, Chris Knowles and James Clayden.

Exhibitions
1982 Biennale of Sydney
National Gallery of Victoria- 2004 Australian Culture Now
Australian National Gallery
Art Gallery of New South Wales
MOCA Sydney
Contemporary Art Centre of South Australia
Linden Art Gallery
Museum of Modern Art at Heide
Monash University Gallery
Australian Centre for Contemporary Art
200 Gertrude Street Gallery
City of Ballarat Fine Art Gallery
Noosa Regional Gallery

Collections
National Gallery of Victoria
Australian National Gallery
Monash University Art Gallery
La Trobe University Art Collection
 Artbank
University of Queensland Art Museum
McClelland Art Gallery
City of Ballarat Fine Art Gallery
State Library of Victoria
Australian Opera

References

Bibliography
"Australian Painting Now", published by Craftsman House Press in Australia, and by Thames and Hudson in the U.K, 2000, with an essay by Charles Green; and an interview with the artist,
"From Red Rattlers to Lara Croft" conducted by Robert Rooney in Art & Australia, vol 38, no.2, Spring 2000.
"Awesome"! By Laura Murray Cree, Craftsman House Press, 2002.

Australian painters
Artists from Melbourne
1955 births
Living people